Figure skating was contested at the 2001 Winter Universiade. Skaters competed in the disciplines of men's singles, ladies singles, pair skating, and ice dancing.

Results

Men

Ladies

Pairs

Ice dancing

External links
 results

2001
Winter Universiade
2001 Winter Universiade
Universiade